Pertti Kalervo Mäkinen, born 16 September 1952 in Tyrvää, is a Finnish sculptor who is the designer of the Finnish 1 euro coin. He has also designed several commemorative coins for the Mint of Finland.

Mäkinen worked as a metal worker before entering an art school in the Finnish town Kankaanpää in 1976. After his graduation in 1979, Mäkinen has worked as a sculptor. He lives and works in Lavia.

Works

Commemorative coins 

1983 World Championships in Athletics, 100mk, 1983.
The Finnish European Union membership, 10mk, 1995.
Elias Lönnrot, 10€, 2002.
2003 Ice Hockey World Championships, 5€, 2003.
2004 enlargement of the European Union, 2€, 2004.
Tove Jansson, 10€, 2004.
Albert Edelfelt, 100€, 2004.
60 years of peace, 10€, 2005.
Åland convention 150 years, 5€, 2006.
Parliament of Finland 100 years, 2€/10€, 2006.
Women's suffrage 100 years, 2€, 2006.
Fredrik Pacius 200 years, 10€, 2009.
Henrik Wigström 150 years, 10€/20€, 2012.
Literacy, 10€, 2014.
Eino Leino, 2€/100€, 2016.

Public sculptures 

Raivaajapatsas, Lapua, 1983.
Merenkulun muistomerkki, Oulu, 1985.
Päivänkierto, Pori 1990.
Lauri Viita monument, Tampere, 1991.
Uittomiehen kosinta, Sastamala, 1992.
Memorial of the Battle of Sampakoski, Lavia, 1998.
Haitarijazz, Kouvola, 2003.
Rakastunut viulu ja mandoliini, Kiikoinen, 2003.
Toriparlamentti, Pori, 2008.
Vanavesi – Kölvattnet, Pori, 2009.

References 

1952 births
People from Satakunta
20th-century Finnish sculptors
21st-century Finnish sculptors
Coin designers
Living people